Ramón Sáez Marzo (8 March 1940 – 18 June 2013) was a Spanish road cyclist who was active between 1962 and 1973. He competed at the 1960 Summer Olympics in the 100 km team time trial and finished in eighth place. Four years later he won a silver medal in this event at the world championships. He won another world championships medal in 1967, in the road race; the same year he finished 85th in the Tour de France. His major road race victories are

1965: stages 11 and 13 of Volta a Portugal, stage 5 of Volta Ciclista a Catalunya, stage 5 of Vuelta a Mallorca
1967: stages 3 and 4 of Vuelta a España
1968: stage 5 of Vuelta a Andalucía, stage 11 of Vuelta a España
1969: stages 7 and 8 of Vuelta a España
1970: stages 8 and 15 of Vuelta a España, stages 3 and 7 of Vuelta a Aragón

References

1940 births
2013 deaths
Olympic cyclists of Spain
Cyclists at the 1960 Summer Olympics
Cyclists from the Valencian Community
People from Requena-Utiel
Sportspeople from the Province of Valencia